Leiognathus longispinis, commonly known as the longspine- or Smithurst's ponyfish, is a fish of brackish and marine waters found in the Indian and western Pacific Oceans, from India through Malaysia and Indonesia south to northern Australia and east to the Philippines and Fiji It was described in 1835 by French Zoologist Achille Valenciennes from a specimen caught off Waigeo island in Irian Jaya in New Guinea. In 1886 Ramsay and Ogilby described what turned out to the same species from Hood Lagoon in Papua New Guinea, naming it Leiognathus smithursti. In 2008, ichthyologists Prosanta Chakrabarty and John S. Sparks resurrected the genus Aurigequula and placed L. longispinis and L. fasciatus in it, on the basis of a horizontal row of yellow markings on their flanks and elongated second spine of the dorsal fin. However, a molecular study showed that the genus Leiognathus was nested within Aurigequula, and hence the genera were merged once more. Fishbase places this species in Leiognathus while retaining  the striped ponyfish (Aurigequula fasciata) in the monotypic Aurigequula.

It is distinguished by a long spine on both its dorsal and anal fin.

Like all members of the ponyfish family, the longspine ponyfish is bioluminescent. The ventral surface glows, which is thought to provide camouflage and confuse predators.

References

Fish of Australia
Fish of the Pacific Ocean
Fish of the Indian Ocean
Fish of the Philippines
Bioluminescent fish
Fish described in 1835
longispinis